Kelechi "KC" Oliver Anuna (born December 1, 1989) is a Nigerian-American basketball player for Potros de Nuevo Casa Grande of Liga de Básquetbol Estatal de Chihuahua (LBE) and the Nigerian national team.

He participated at the AfroBasket 2017.

References

1989 births
Living people
Nigerian men's basketball players
Basketball players from Raleigh, North Carolina
Point guards
American men's basketball players